Andrea Manfredi (10 February 1992 – 29 October 2018) was an Italian cyclist, who, at the time of his death, competed for amateur team Palazzago in anticipation of returning to professional racing in 2019. Prior to that, Manfredi was a professional rider with the team of Bardiani-CSF.

Manfredi was one of 189 killed onboard Lion Air Flight 610 when it crashed into the Java Sea shortly after takeoff.

Major results
2012

3rd Giro della Valle d'Aosta

2nd stage win

References

External links

1992 births
2018 deaths
Italian male cyclists
People from Massa
Victims of aviation accidents or incidents in Indonesia
Victims of aviation accidents or incidents in 2018
Sportspeople from the Province of Massa-Carrara
Cyclists from Tuscany